Gaius Valgius Rufus, was a Roman senator, and a contemporary of Horace and Maecenas. He succeeded Marcus Valerius Messalla Corvinus as suffect consul upon the latter's death in 12 BC. Rufus is best known as a writer of elegies and epigrams, and his contemporaries believed him capable of great things in epic writing. The author of the panegyric on Messalla Corvinus compared Rufus as the equal of Homer.

Rufus did not confine himself to poetry. He discussed grammatical questions by correspondence, translated the rhetorical manual of his teacher Apollodorus of Pergamon, and began a treatise on medicinal plants, dedicated to Augustus. Horace addressed to him the ninth ode of the second book of his poems.

References

Further reading
Jonathan August Weichert, Poetarum Latinorum...Vitae et Carminum Reliquiae (1830)
Robert Unger, De Valgii Rufi poematis (1848)
Otto Ribbeck, Geschichte der romischen Dichtung (1889), ii.
Martin Schanz, Geschichte der romischen Litteratur (1899), ii.
Wilhelm Siegmund Teuffel, History of Roman Literature (Eng. trans., 1900), 241

Rufus
Golden Age Latin writers
1st-century BC Romans
1st-century BC Roman poets
Suffect consuls of Imperial Rome